Marvin De Lima (born 19 April 2004) is a French professional footballer who plays as a midfielder for  club Bordeaux.

Club career 
On 6 August 2022, De Lima made his professional debut for Bordeaux, scoring his team's final goal in a 3–0 Ligue 2 win over Rodez. Having come on as a substitute, his goal came two minutes and twenty seconds after his entrance onto the field, making him the fastest player to score a debut league goal for Bordeaux since 2006, and only the sixth player to score on his debut for the club as a substitute.

International career
Born in France, De Lima is of Portuguese descent. He was called up to both the Portugal U19s and France U19s in November 2022.

Career statistics

References

External links 
 

2004 births
Living people
Sportspeople from Bayonne
French footballers
French people of Portuguese descent
Association football midfielders
FC Girondins de Bordeaux players
Championnat National 3 players
Ligue 2 players